Calliarus or Kalliaros was a town in Eastern Locris mentioned by Homer in the Catalogue of Ships of the Iliad. It was uninhabited in Strabo's time, but its name was still attached to a tract of ground on account of the fertility of the latter. According to Greek mythology, the town's eponymous founder was Kalliaros, a son of Laonome and Hodoedocus.

Its site is tentative located near Skala Atalantis.

References

Populated places in Opuntian Locris
Former populated places in Greece
Locations in the Iliad